Melaleuca spathulata is a shrub in the myrtle family, Myrtaceae, and is endemic to the south-west of Western Australia. It is a well known garden shrub featuring dark green leaves against light-coloured foliage, many twisted branches and profuse heads of bright pink "pom pom" flower heads in spring or early summer.

Description
Its branches are often twisted and mostly glabrous. The leaves have a mid-vein and a number of indistinct parallel veins.

The flowers are a shade of pink to purple and are arranged in spikes on the ends of branches which continue to grow after flowering, and sometimes in the upper leaf axils. The stamens are arranged in five bundles around the flowers and each bundle contains 2 to 5 (mostly 3) stamens.

Taxonomy
Melaleuca spathulata was first formally described in 1844 by Johannes Conrad Schauer in Plantae Preissianae. The specific epithet (spathulata) is from the Ancient Greek σπάθη (spathê) meaning "broad blade" or "paddle for stirring and mixing" referring to the spoon-like leaf shape.

Distribution and habitat
Melaleuca sieberi occurs in and between the Gnowangerup, Pingrup, Albany and Bremer Bay districts in the Avon Wheatbelt, Esperance Plains, Jarrah Forest, Mallee and Warren biogeographic regions. It grows in sandy, clayey and gravelly soils in winter-wet areas and on low ridges.

Conservation
This species is classified as "not threatened" by the Government of Western Australia Department of Parks and Wildlife.

Use in horticulture
Melaleuca spathulata is well known in cultivation because of its interesting foliage and attractive heads of flowers. It prefers a sunny, well-drained position but will also grow in heavier soils. It is frost hardy and pest resistant, having been grown for more than ten years in the Australian National Botanic Gardens in Canberra. It is cultivated from seed or from cuttings taken when the new growth is beginning to harden.

References

spathulata
Plants described in 1844
Endemic flora of Western Australia
Taxa named by Johannes Conrad Schauer